The 2013 CIS/CCA Curling Championships were held from March 20 to 24 at the Kamloops Curling Club in Kamloops, British Columbia. The host university of the event was Thompson Rivers University in Kamloops.

Men

Teams
The teams are listed as follows:

Round Robin Standings
Final Round Robin Standings

Round Robin Results
All draw times listed in Pacific Daylight Time (UTC−7).

Draw 1
Wednesday, March 24, 10:00 am

Draw 2
Wednesday, March 24, 3:00 pm

Draw 3
Thursday, March 25, 2:00 pm

Draw 4
Thursday, March 25, 7:00 pm

Draw 5
Friday, March 26, 9:00 am

Draw 6
Friday, March 26, 2:00 pm

Draw 7
Saturday, March 27, 9:00 am

Playoffs

Semifinal
Saturday, March 23, 7:00 pm

Final
Sunday, March 24, 2:00 pm

Women

Teams
The teams are listed as follows:

Round Robin Standings
Final Round Robin Standings

Round Robin Results
All draw times listed in Pacific Daylight Time (UTC−7).

Draw 1
Wednesday, March 24, 10:00 am

Draw 2
Wednesday, March 24, 3:00 pm

Draw 3
Thursday, March 25, 2:00 pm

Draw 4
Thursday, March 25, 7:00 pm

Draw 5
Friday, March 26, 9:00 am

Draw 6
Friday, March 26, 2:00 pm

Draw 7
Saturday, March 27, 9:00 am

Playoffs

Semifinal
Saturday, March 23, 7:00 pm

Final
Sunday, March 24, 2:00 pm

Awards and honours
The all-star teams and award winners are as follows:

All-Canadian teams
Men
First Team
Skip:  Jake Walker, University of Waterloo
Third:  Edward Cyr, University of Waterloo
Second:  Ian McMillan, University of Manitoba
Lead:  Ben Creaser, Acadia University

Second Team
Skip:  Brendan Bottcher, University of Alberta
Third:  Mick Lizmore, University of Alberta
Second:  Brad Thiessen, University of Alberta
Lead:  James Freeman, University of Waterloo

Women
First Team
Skip:  Kelsey Rocque, University of Alberta
Third:  Keely Brown, University of Alberta
Second:  Erica Ortt, University of Alberta
Lead:  Krysten Karwacki, University of Manitoba

Second Team
Skip:  Breanne Meakin, University of Manitoba
Third:  Ashley Howard, University of Manitoba
Second:  Selena Kaatz, University of Manitoba
Lead:  Stephanie Thompson, University of Western Ontario

CIS Coaching awards
Men
 Alan Mayhew, Acadia University

Women
 Rory Munro, University of Western Ontario

Sportsmanship awards
Men
 Alex Trites, Acadia University second

Women
 Jackie Rivington, University of Western Ontario third

References

External links
Home page

2013 in curling
Sport in Kamloops
Curling in British Columbia
2013 in Canadian curling